Craigo railway station served the village of Craigo, Angus, Scotland from 1851 to 1956 on the Aberdeen Railway.

History 
The station opened in 1851 by the Aberdeen Railway. The station closed to both passengers and goods traffic on 11 June 1956.

References

External links 

Disused railway stations in Angus, Scotland
Former Caledonian Railway stations
Railway stations in Great Britain opened in 1851
Railway stations in Great Britain closed in 1956
1851 establishments in Scotland
1956 disestablishments in Scotland